Jung Young-Ho (born July 13, 1982) is a male freestyle wrestler from South Korea. He participated in the men's freestyle 66 kg at the 2008 Summer Olympics, but was eliminated in the 1/8 of final losing against Serafim Barzakov.

He also participated in the men's freestyle 60 kg at the 2004 Summer Olympics where he was ranked 7th.

External links
 Wrestler bio on beijing2008.com

Living people
1982 births
Olympic wrestlers of South Korea
South Korean male sport wrestlers
Wrestlers at the 2004 Summer Olympics
Wrestlers at the 2008 Summer Olympics
20th-century South Korean people
21st-century South Korean people